The 2017 OFC U-19 Women's Championship was the 8th edition of the OFC U-19/U-20 Women's Championship, the biennial international youth football championship organised by the Oceania Football Confederation (OFC) for the women's under-19/under-20 national teams of Oceania. The tournament was held in New Zealand between 11–24 July 2017.

For this tournament the age limit was lowered from under-20 to under-19. The winners of the tournament qualified for the 2018 FIFA U-20 Women's World Cup in France as the OFC representative.

Teams
A total of six (out of 11) OFC member national teams entered the tournament.

Did not enter

Venue
The matches were played at the Ngahue Reserve in Auckland.

Squads

Players born on or after 1 January 1998 were eligible to compete in the tournament. Each team could name a maximum of 20 players.

Matches
The tournament was played in round-robin format. There were three matches on each matchday. The draw for the fixtures was held on 31 May 2017 at the OFC Headquarters in Auckland, New Zealand.

All times were local, NZST (UTC+12).

Winners

The following team from OFC qualified for the 2018 FIFA U-20 Women's World Cup.

1 Bold indicates champions for that year. Italic indicates hosts for that year.

Awards
The following awards were given at the conclusion of the tournament.

Goalscorers
11 goals

 Emma Main

9 goals

 Samantha Tawharu

8 goals

 Hannah Blake

7 goals

 Luisa Tamanitoakula
 Nicollete Ageva

6 goals

 Dayna Stevens

4 goals

 Cema Nasau

3 goals

 Michaela Foster
 Deven Jackson
 Grace Jale
 Jacklyn Maiyosi
 Ramona Padio

2 goals

 Alice Wenessia
 Jacqui Hand
 Hunter Malaki
 Mele Kafa

1 goal

 Asenaca Diranuve
 Oceane Forest
 Isabelle Hnaweongo
 Marie-Laure Palene
 Nicole Mettam
 Selina Unamba
 Shalom Fiso
 Seini Lutu

1 own goal

 Mariecamilla Ah Ki (playing against New Zealand)
 Helen Tahitua (playing against New Zealand)
 Nipa Talasinga (playing against Samoa)

References

External links
2017 OFC U-19 Women's Championship, oceaniafootball.com
Results

2017
U-19 Women's Championship
2017 in women's association football
2017 in youth association football
2017 OFC U-19 Women's Championship
July 2017 sports events in New Zealand